5-Chloro-α-methyltryptamine (5-Chloro-αMT), also known as PAL-542, is a tryptamine derivative related to α-methyltryptamine (αMT) and one of only a few known specific serotonin-dopamine releasing agents (SDRAs). It has been investigated in animals as a potential treatment for cocaine dependence. The EC50 values of 5-chloro-αMT in evoking the in vitro release of serotonin (5-HT), dopamine (DA), and norepinephrine (NE) in rat synaptosomes were reported as 16 nM, 54 nM, and 3434 nM, with an NE/DA ratio of 63.6 and a DA/5-HT ratio of 3.38, indicating that it is a highly specific and well-balanced SDRA. However, 5-chloro-αMT has also been found to act as a potent full agonist of the 5-HT2A receptor, with an EC50 value of 6.27 nM and an efficacy of 105%, and almost assuredly acts as a potent agonist of other serotonin receptors as well.

5-Chloro-αMT was found to not reliably produce intracranial self-administration in rats or substitute for cocaine in rats or monkeys. It was found through study of 5-chloro-αMT in rhesus monkeys that norepinephrine release has minimal influence on the abuse potential of monoamine releasing agents and that loss of norepinephrine release activity does not affect efficacy in reducing cocaine self-administration in SDRAs relative to serotonin-norepinephrine-dopamine releasing agents (SNDRAs) such as naphthylisopropylamine (PAL-287). However, SDRAs like PAL-542 would, in theory, be expected to produce fewer side effects (including sympathomimetic/cardiovascular effects, insomnia, hyperthermia, and anxiety) relative to SNDRAs, and thus would likely be comparatively more favorable in the treatment of cocaine dependence and other conditions.

A related agent, 5-fluoro-α-methyltryptamine (5-fluoro-αMT), also known as PAL-544, is a potent MAO-A inhibitor in addition to SNDRA and 5-HT2A receptor agonist. Due to their close structural similarity, 5-chloro-αMT might also possess activity as an MAO-A inhibitor, a property which, in combination with its activity as monoamine releasing agent, could potentially render it dangerous in an analogous manner to the phenethylamine derivative para-methoxyamphetamine (PMA). In addition, α-ethyltryptamine (αET), an SNDRA and close structural analogue of αMT and 5-chloro-αMT, like many other releasing agents of both 5-HT and DA such as MDMA, has been found to produce long-lasting serotonergic neurotoxicity in rats, and the same could also prove true for 5-chloro-αMT and other monoamine-releasing tryptamines.

As a 5-HT2A receptor agonist, 5-chloro-αMT very likely possesses the capacity for psychedelic effects. Indeed, its close analog 5-fluoro-αMT produces a strong head-twitch response in rats, a property which is highly correlated with psychedelic effects in humans, and αMT is well-established as a psychedelic drug in humans.

Legality
5-Chloro-AMT is illegal in Singapore.

See also
 3-Chloromethamphetamine
 4-Methyl-αMT
 4-Hydroxy-αMT
 4-Methyl-αET
 5-Chloro-DMT
 5-Cl-bk-MPA
 5-EtO-AMT
 5-MeO-αMT
 5-MeO-αET
 6-Fluoro-αMT
 7-Methyl-αET
 7-Chloro-AMT
 5-API (PAL-571)
 α,N,N-TMT
 N-t-Butyltryptamine
 ST-1936

References

5-HT2A agonists
Entactogens and empathogens
Chloroarenes
Psychedelic tryptamines
Serotonin-dopamine releasing agents
Serotonin receptor agonists
Stimulants